Christine is the score by John Carpenter in association with Alan Howarth to the 1983 film of the same name. It was released in 1989 through Varèse Sarabande.

Track listing

Personnel
 John Carpenter – composition, performance, production
 Alan Howarth – sequencing, engineering, mixing, production
 Tom Null – sequencing
 Robert Townson – executive producer

References

John Carpenter soundtracks
1989 soundtrack albums
Horror film soundtracks
Film scores
Varèse Sarabande soundtracks